Daniel Perez is a Dutch paralympic boccia player. He participated at the 2016 Summer Paralympics in the boccia competition, being awarded the silver medal in the individual BC1 event.

References

External links 
Paralympic Games profile

Living people
Place of birth missing (living people)
Year of birth missing (living people)
Boccia players
Boccia players at the 2016 Summer Paralympics
Medalists at the 2016 Summer Paralympics
Paralympic medalists in boccia
Paralympic silver medalists for the Netherlands
21st-century Dutch people